Mananara Nord Airport is an airport in Mananara Nord, Analanjirofo Region, Madagascar .

References

Airports in Madagascar